The 2010 Women's EuroHockey Junior Championships was the 15th edition of the Women's EuroHockey Junior Championship, an under 21 women's field hockey tournament. It was held in Lille, France, from 25–31 July 2010.

Netherlands won the tournament for the seventh time after defeating England 4–1 in the final. Spain won the bronze medal, defeating Germany 2–1 in the third place playoff.

Participating nations
Alongside the host nation, 7 teams competed in the tournament.

Results

Preliminary round

Pool A

Pool B

Classification round

Fifth to eighth place classification

Pool C

First to fourth place classification

Semi-finals

Third and fourth place

Final

References

Women's EuroHockey Junior Championship
Junior
EuroHockey Junior Championship
field hockey
International women's field hockey competitions hosted by France
EuroHockey Junior Championship
Sport in Lille